Chaudagra is a town in Bindki municipal board, Fatehpur district, Uttar Pradesh, India. 

Chaudagra is surrounded by the villages of Mauhar, Sai, Harsingpur, Rampur, and Rawatpur . The town is located on Kanpur Allahabad National Highway NH2, 1 km from the Bindki Road railway station and 5 km from the Ganges river. Also Chaudagra is sandwiched between Fatehpur and Kanpur.

Local industry includes Pipes Tubes, Britannia Biscuits, Panem Saria Gurder, and Corpo Electronics.

References

Cities and towns in Fatehpur district